John Jones Jenkins, 1st Baron Glantawe (10 May 1835 – 27 July 1915) was a Welsh tin-plate manufacturer and Liberal politician. Having commenced working at the Upper Forest Tinplate Works in Morriston, at the age of fifteen, he ended his life as one of the wealthiest men in Glamorgan.

Background
Jenkins was the son of Jenkin Jenkins of Morriston, Glamorgan, and his wife, Sarah Jones.

Business career
Jenkins was co-founder and manager of the Beaufort Tinplate Works at Morriston in 1859, where he was chief manager and partner until 1869.

Political career
Jenkins was a Justice of the Peace for Swansea and Carmarthenshire and Mayor of Swansea three times, in 1869, 1879 and 1880. He was knighted on 17 May 1882. He stood unsuccessfully for parliament at Carmarthen in 1880, but was elected Member of Parliament for the constituency in a by-election in 1882. 

Jenkins held the seat until 1886 when he joined the Liberal Unionist party in opposition to Home Rule for Ireland but lost against an official Liberal Party candidate. In 1889, he was High Sheriff of Glamorgan. Jenkins was elected for Carmarthen as a Liberal Unionist in 1895 and held the seat until 1900. 

On 18 July 1906 he was raised to the peerage as Baron Glantawe, of Swansea in the County of Glamorgan.

Personal life
Lord Glantawe married, firstly, Margaret Rees, daughter of Josiah Rees, on 20 January 1854. She died after 9 years of marriage. He married, secondly, Catherine Prudence Daniel, daughter of Edward Daniel, on 10 May 1864 at Llansamlet, Glamorgan. Jenkins had two daughters by his second wife -- Olga Violet Jenkins, Mrs Daniell (b. 1878) and Alina Kate Elaine Jenkins, Lady Bledisloe (b. 1880) -- but had no male heir. (Alina married Lord Bledisloe in 1928 and died in 1956.)

Glantawe died, aged 80, at The Grange, West Cross in Swansea, now the site of the Territorial Army base, and was buried at Oystermouth Cemetery. The peerage died with him as he had left no male heir.

References

External links 

Glantawe
Glantawe
Liberal Party (UK) MPs for Welsh constituencies
UK MPs 1880–1885
UK MPs 1885–1886
UK MPs 1895–1900
UK MPs who were granted peerages
Glantawe
Members of Glamorgan County Council
High Sheriffs of Glamorgan
Mayors of Swansea
Liberal Unionist Party MPs for Welsh constituencies
Members of the Parliament of the United Kingdom for Carmarthenshire constituencies
Liberal Unionist Party peers
Knights Bachelor
Peers created by Edward VII
Welsh justices of the peace